The Department of Environment and Science is a department of the Queensland Government which is responsible for protecting the state's natural environment, developing the government's science strategy, and driving the government's policy and program direction for young people in Queensland. The minister responsible for the department is Meaghan Scanlon. The department provides administrative support for the Queensland Heritage Council and the Queensland Heritage Register.

History
The Department of Environment and Heritage Protection was established in April 2012, as part of a series of changes to the machinery of government after the LNP's win at the 2012 election. The department took on most of the functions of the Department of Environment and Resource Management which was dissolved. In December 2017, it was renamed to the Department of Environment and Science.

Ministers

Ministers for this department (and similar predecessors) include:

See also

Environment of Australia
Protected areas of Queensland

References

External links

 

Environment of Queensland
Environment and Heritage Protection
Queensland